The Sikanni Range is a subrange of the Omineca Mountains in the Northern Interior of British Columbia, located between the Omineca and Atsika Rivers.

See also
Sikanni (disambiguation)
Sekani

References

Omineca Mountains
Omineca Country